Jaggers is a surname. Notable people with the surname include:

Bobby Jaggers (1948–2012), American wrestler
Orval Lee Jaggers (1916–2004), American Christian minister, writer, and scholar

See also
Great Expectations#Mr Jaggers and his circle
Jagger